Chionodes fictor is a moth in the family Gelechiidae. It is found in North America, where it has been recorded from Alaska, British Columbia and the Northwest Territories.

References

Chionodes
Moths described in 1999
Moths of North America